Hearts Aflame may refer to:

 Hearts Aflame (film), a 1923 silent film directed by Reginald Barker
 Hearts Aflame (novel), a 1987 romance novel by Johanna Lindsey

See also
Hearts Afire, a 1990s television sitcom
Hearts on Fire (disambiguation)